Suicide and the Internet have increasingly important relationships as Internet use becomes more ubiquitous. 

Several Internet suicides have occurred, and issues involving social media and suicide have gained some attention. A survey has found that suicide-risk individuals who went online for suicide-related purposes, compared with online users who did not, reported greater suicide-risk symptoms, were less likely to seek help and perceived less social support. Jurisdictional hindrances have sometimes prevented governments from effectively restricting pro-suicide sites and sites that describe suicide methods. In 2008, police in the United Kingdom expressed concern that "Internet cults" and the desire for achieving prestige via online memorials may encourage suicides.

Although there are concerns that the Internet may be a dangerous platform, where suicidal people might find suicide methods or encouragement to kill themselves, research has shown that the internet is more likely to have a positive than a negative influence.

See also
Social media and suicide
Internet homicide
Blue Whale Challenge
Instagram's impact on people
Death of Conrad Roy
We found a dead body in the Japanese Suicide Forest..., a controversial YouTube video about the discovery of a suicide victim's body

References